The Flemish Shop (other English-language titles are The Flemish House and Maigret and the Flemish Shop) is a detective novel by Belgian writer Georges Simenon, featuring his character inspector Jules Maigret.

Other titles
The book has been translated three times into English: in 1940 by Geoffrey Sainsbury as The Flemish Shop, in 1990 as Maigret and the Flemish Shop by Geoffrey Sainsbury, and in 2015 by Shaun Whiteside as The Flemish House.

Adaptations
The novel has been adapted three times for film and television: in French in 1992 as Maigret chez les Flamands, with Bruno Cremer in the main role, and in 1976 as Maigret chez les Flamandswith Jean Richard in the lead role; in English in 1963 as The Flemish Shop, with Rupert Davies in the main role.

Literature
Maurice Piron, Michel Lemoine, L'Univers de Simenon, guide des romans et nouvelles (1931-1972) de Georges Simenon, Presses de la Cité, 1983, p. 282-283

External links

Maigret at trussel.com

References 

1932 Belgian novels
Maigret novels
Novels set in France
Novels set in the 20th century